The APEC Indonesia 2013 was the 25th annual gathering of APEC leaders. It was held in Bali on 5–7 October 2013. The summit also saw the revival of wearing national dress, which had been explicitly discontinued by US President Barack Obama two years prior.

Attendees
This was the first APEC meeting for Australian Prime Minister Tony Abbott, Chinese President Xi Jinping, Japanese Prime Minister Shinzō Abe (in his comeback), South Korean President Park Geun-hye and Mexican President Enrique Peña Nieto since their inaugurations on 18 September 2013, 15 March 2013, 26 December 2012, 25 February 2013 and 1 December 2012, respectively.

It will also be the last APEC meeting for Chilean President Sebastian Piñera (who stepped down on March 11, 2014 following the 2013 Chilean election), as well Thai Prime Minister Yingluck Shinawatra (who was ousted on May 7, 2014 following the 2013–14 political crisis in Thailand) and the host, Indonesian President Susilo Bambang Yudhoyono (who stepped down on October 20, 2014 following the 2014 Indonesian presidential election).

United States President Barack Obama canceled his trip due to the United States federal government shutdown of 2013, sending Secretary of State John Kerry in his place.

References

External links
 

2013
2013 in Indonesia
2013 in economics
Economy of Indonesia
Diplomatic conferences in Indonesia
21st-century diplomatic conferences (Asia-Pacific)
2013 in international relations
2013 conferences
21st century in Bali
October 2013 events in Asia